Elections to City of Lincoln Council were held on Thursday 5 May 2011.

There were 11 seats up for election, one third of the councillors. The Labour Party gained control of the council, which had previously been under no overall control.

Election result

Ward results

Abbey Ward

Birchwood Ward

Boultham Ward

Bracebridge Ward

Carholme Ward

Castle Ward

Glebe Ward

Hartsholme Ward

Minster Ward

Moorland Ward

Park Ward

References

2011 English local elections
2011
2010s in Lincolnshire